Balázs Laluska (born 20 June 1981 in Szeged) is a former Hungarian handballer and current coach.

Achievements
Nemzeti Bajnokság I:
Winner: 2011, 2012
Silver Medalist: 2002, 2003, 2004, 2005, 2009
Bronze Medalist: 1999, 2000, 2001
Magyar Kupa:
Winner: 2011, 2012
Silver Medalist: 2000, 2002, 2003, 2004, 2005, 2009
Liga ASOBAL:
Bronze Medalist: 2007, 2008
Copa del Rey:
Silver Medalist: 2007
Copa ASOBAL:
Silver Medalist: 2008
Slovenian Championship:
Bronze Medalist: 2010
EHF Cup Winners' Cup:
Finalist: 2007

Individual awards
   Golden Cross of the Cross of Merit of the Republic of Hungary (2012)

References

External links
 Balázs Laluska player profile on MKB Veszprém KC official website
 Balázs Laluska career statistics at Worldhandball

1981 births
Living people
Hungarian male handball players
Sportspeople from Szeged
Olympic handball players of Hungary
Handball players at the 2004 Summer Olympics
Handball players at the 2012 Summer Olympics
Expatriate handball players
Hungarian expatriate sportspeople in Spain
Hungarian expatriate sportspeople in Slovenia
Hungarian expatriate sportspeople in France